Mary Anne Bobinski (born 1962) is dean of the Emory University School of Law and an American legal scholar and educator whose research focuses on health law in the United States and Canada. She was the dean of the Allard School of Law at the University of British Columbia from 2003 to 2015 and is a past President of the American Society of Law, Medicine and Ethics.

Bobinski was born in Cortland, New York and studied at the State University of New York at Buffalo where she received her BA in psychology in 1982 and her JD in 1987. She served a judicial clerkship with Max Rosenn of the U.S. Court of Appeals for the Third Circuit and then did further study at Harvard Law School, receiving her LL.M. in 1989.  She joined the faculty of the University of Houston Law Center in 1989 as an assistant professor. She served as Director of the Health Law and Policy Institute there from 2001 and from 2002 was the John and Rebecca Moores Professor of Law. In 2003 she was appointed Dean of the Allard School of Law at the University of British Columbia and served in that post through 2015. She is a current (December 2017) member of the Committee of the Allard Prize for International Integrity.

On May 23, 2019, Emory University announced the appointment of Bobinski as Dean of Emory University School of Law, making her the first woman to serve in the role since Emory Law's founding in 1916.

References

Further reading
Sarra, Janis (September 2004). "On the Front Cover: Mary Anne Bobinski, Dean of the UBC Faculty of Law". The Advocate, Vol. 62, Part 5, pp. 657–659. University of British Columbia

1962 births
Living people
Academic staff of the Peter A. Allard School of Law
Harvard Law School alumni
Canadian university and college faculty deans
Women deans (academic)
Deans of law schools in Canada
Deans of law schools in the United States
American academic administrators
American women legal scholars
American legal scholars
University at Buffalo alumni